The northern cottonmouth (Agkistrodon piscivorus) is a semiaquatic pit viper found in the southeastern United States.

The Florida cottonmouth (Agkistrodon conanti) is a similar semiaquatic pit viper found on the Florida peninsula and southern Georgia.

Cottonmouth may also refer to:

Medical symptom 
 Xerostomia, or dry mouth, a medical symptom

Arts and entertainment

Fictional characters and elements
 Cottonmouth (Cornell Stokes), a supervillain in the Marvel Comics universe
 Cottonmouth (Burchell Clemens), a supervillain in the Marvel Comics universe
 O-Ren Ishii, or Cottonmouth, a character in the film Kill Bill: Volume 1
 Cottonmouth, a character in the 1978 film Convoy
 Cottonmouth, a fictional city and the setting for Manhunt 2

Music
 "Cotton Mouth", a 1972 song by the Doobie Brothers from Toulouse Street
 "Cottonmouth", a 1996 song by the Melvins
 "Cottonmouth", a 2005 song by Todd Bowie from Lucky Space People
 "Cottonmouth", a 2007 song by Emanuel (band) from Black Earth Tiger
 "Cottonmouth", a 2008 song by Sam Sparro from Sam Sparro
 "Cottonmouth", a 2015 song by In Hearts Wake from Skydancer

Television
 "Cottonmouth" (Justified), a 2011 episode of Justified